Christa Marion Ackroyd is an English journalist and broadcaster, best known as a former presenter for the regional TV news programmes Calendar (for ITV Yorkshire) and BBC Look North.

Early life
Ackroyd, whose father was a policeman, attended Hanson Girls' Grammar School (now Hanson Academy) from 1968 (which had moved to its new site in Five Lane Ends in 1967), which became the co-educational comprehensive Hanson School in 1972.

Career

Print and radio
After leaving school, Ackroyd spent four years working for the Halifax Courier. She began her broadcasting career in the newsroom of commercial radio station Pennine Radio in Bradford (now The Pulse of West Yorkshire), where she led the station's coverage of the Yorkshire Ripper case.

In 1981, she moved to neighbouring Radio Aire in Leeds, reading its first news bulletin on its opening day. In November 1982, she was appointed as the UK's first female radio news editor. Ackroyd was promoted as Radio Aire's programming controller in 1985, often presenting weekend shows and the station's flagship news programme, Radio Aire Reports.

In 2014, Ackroyd was made patron of Radio Aire's Cash for Kids charity.

Regional television news
Ackroyd switched to television in 1990 and became a co-anchor for Yorkshire Television's regional news programme Calendar, originally alongside Richard Whiteley, and later, Mike Morris. In September 2001, she switched to the BBC to present the Leeds-based edition of Look North with Harry Gration.

While working at Yorkshire Television and the BBC, Ackroyd also wrote a weekly column for the Sunday Express. In 2004, she refused to give up the column following a BBC request amid concerns over impartiality. She resigned from the paper in January 2007.

Departure from the BBC
Ackroyd presented her last Look North programme on 1 March 2013. Several weeks later, a Yorkshire Post article questioned her absence from the programme and whether her salary, reported to be around £150,000 per year, was justified. The BBC declined to explain her prolonged absence, citing unspecified "editorial reasons". Shipley MP Philip Davies called for the corporation to explain whether Ackroyd was still being paid despite her ongoing absence.

In July 2013, the BBC announced that Ackroyd had been dismissed after what was considered to be an unspecified "breach of contract" and would not return to present Look North. Ackroyd's freelance contract was terminated without compensation.

Other roles
Since her departure from the BBC, Ackroyd has played some minor roles in television drama, including the Danish series Bedrag (Follow the money) in 2016. She also returned to ITV Yorkshire as a freelance journalist for Calendar, covering the Rotherham count at the 2015 general election. She is now a columnist for the Yorkshire Post. In January 2022 Ackroyd joined the team of regular contributors to Our Great Yorkshire Life, a 20 part-series for Channel 5. In her role as a Yorkshire-based journalist, Ackroyd hosts a series of short films meeting people across the region with interesting stories in interesting places. She visited Saltaire in Shipley and is to visit other well known places such as Haworth and York Minster.

Taxation case
In July 2013, it was revealed that HM Revenue and Customs had started an investigation into Ackroyd's tax arrangements, whilst employed by the BBC. Under an agreement with the BBC, Ackroyd was employed via what became known as a Personal Services Company Contract, Christa Ackroyd Media Limited, through which her remuneration was paid, whist still being herself directly contracted to the BBC. In February 2018, the First Tier Tribunal confirmed that for the tax years covering 2006–07 to 2012–13, Ackroyd owed income tax and National Insurance contributions (NICs) amounting to £419,151. It was the first IR35 case that HMRC had won in seven years. The court documents indicate Ackroyd's BBC contract was ended because of HMRC's formal demand made against her. The figure was actually almost half that amount because taxes already paid had not been taken into account . The judge in the case stressed Miss Ackroyd had done nothing wrong, had acted honestly and had been ‘encouraged’ by the BBC to sign such a contract . In February 2019 Lord Hall the Director General of the BBC told a commons committee that the corporation took full responsibility for the use of personal services company contracts and apologised to presenters.

Personal life
Ackroyd married Chris Sutcliffe in 1982 in Halifax. They live in Stainland, near Halifax, West Yorkshire. They have three children and three grandchildren. In July 2008 she was awarded an honorary degree by the University of Bradford alongside former co-anchor Harry Gration. She is also a fellow of Bradford College.

References

External links
 
 TV Ark
 TV News Room
Radio Aire Archive (1981-1984)

Living people
BBC newsreaders and journalists
ITV regional newsreaders and journalists
Mass media in Yorkshire
Television personalities from West Yorkshire
Yorkshire Television
Year of birth missing (living people)